The following is a list of notable deaths in August 1992.

Entries for each day are listed alphabetically by surname. A typical entry lists information in the following sequence:
 Name, age, country of citizenship at birth, subsequent country of citizenship (if applicable), reason for notability, cause of death (if known), and reference.

August 1992

1
Margarita Aliger, 76, Russian writer.
Alfred "Chico" Alvarez, 72, Canadian trumpeter.
Bob Peak, 65, American illustrator.
Aleksey Konstantinovich Ryazanov, 72, Soviet flying ace and war hero during world War II.

2
Michel Berger, 44, French singer-songwriter, heart attack.
Tom W. Blackburn, 79, American author, screenwriter and lyricist.
Alf Cleverley, 84, New Zealand boxer and Olympian.
Oscar Hagberg, 83, American football player and coach.
Ephraim Katz, 60, Israeli-American filmmaker and writer, emphysema.
Igor Vladimirovich Makeyev, 20, Azerbaijani soldier, killed in battle.
Thomas Brennan Nolan, 91, American geologist.
John Simerson, 57, American gridiron football player.
Jim Weatherall, 62, American football player.

3
Ebbe Carlsson, 44, Swedish journalist and publisher, AIDS-related complications.
Fereydoun Farrokhzad, 53, Iranian entertainer, humanitarian, and dissident, murdered.
Wang Hongwen, 56, Chinese politician, liver cancer.
Don Lang, 67, English trombonist and singer, cancer.
E. Hansford McCourt, 83, American politician.
Nicanor Costa Méndez, 69, Argentine diplomat.
Tetsu Nakamura, 83, Japanese film actor and opera singer.
Eddie Riska, 72, American basketball player.

4
Ralph Cooper, 84, American actor and screenwriter, cancer.
Norm King, 73, Australian politician.
Seichō Matsumoto, 82, Japanese author.
František Tomášek, 93, Czech Roman Catholic cardinal.

5
Juan David García Bacca, 91, Spanish-Venezuelan philosopher.
Tante Leen, 80, Dutch levenslied singer.
Robert Muldoon, 70, New Zealand politician, prime minister (1975–1984).
Achyut Patwardhan, 87, Indian independence activist and politician.
Jeff Porcaro, 38, American drummer (Toto), heart attack.
Bhagat Puran Singh, 88, Indian writer, environmentalist, and philanthropist.
Lefty Wilkie, 77, Canadian-American baseball player.

6
Beyler Agayev, 23, Azerbaijani soldier and war hero, killed in action.
Simcha Bunim Alter, 94, Israeli orthodox rabbi.
Heinrich Eckstein, 85, German politician.
Frank Jerwa, 83, Polish-Canadian ice hockey left winger.
Zakir Majidov, 36, Azerbaijani soldier, helicopter crash.
Ruslan Polovinko, 22, Ukrainian-Azerbaijani helicopter pilot, helicopter crash.
Javanshir Rahimov, 19, Azerbaijani soldier, helicopter crash.
Mazahir Rustamov, 32, Azerbaijani soldier and war hero, killed in action.
Massimo Salvadori, 84, British-Italian historian and anti-fascist.

7
Alakbar Aliyev, 36, Azerbaijani soldier and war hero, killed in action.
John Anderson, 69, American actor (Psycho, Eight Men Out, MacGyver), heart attack.
Aslan Qabil oğlu Atakişiyev, 38, Azerbaijani officer and war hero, killed in action.
Leszek Błażyński, 43, Polish boxer and Olympic medalist, suicide.
Pablo Cumo, 94, Argentine actor.
Mariusz Dmochowski, 61, Polish actor.
Moma Marković, 79, Serbian communist politician.
Francisco Fernández Ordóñez, 62, Spanish politician, cancer.
Sándor Szabó, 51, Hungarian fencer and Olympian.
Berthold Teusner, 85, Australian politician.

8
Abu al-Qasim al-Khoei, 92, Iranian Marja'.
Ivan Anikeyev, 59, Soviet cosmonaut, cancer.
Alison Gertz, 26, American AIDS activist, AIDS.
Mohan Jayamaha, 43, Sri Lankan naval admiral, landmine explosion.
Denzil Kobbekaduwa, 52, Sri Lankan lieutenant general, landmine explosion.
John Kordic, 27, Canadian ice hockey player (Montreal Canadiens, Toronto Maple Leafs, Washington Capitals), drug overdose.
Egisto Macchi, 64, Italian composer.
Thomas J. McIntyre, 77, American politician, member of the U.S. Senate (1962–1979).
Bertalan Papp, 78, Hungarian fencer.
Vijaya Wimalaratne, 51, Sri Lankan general, landmine explosion.

9
Sukhdev Singh Babbar, 37, Indian Sikh militant, shot.
Patrick Devlin, Baron Devlin, 86, British judge.
Manuel Ulloa Elias, 69, Peruvian politician and economist.
Blaž Kraljević, 44, Bosnian soldier, shot.
David Llewellyn, 76, British politician and junior minister.
Bill Russell, 87, American composer.
H. W. Whillock, 88, American politician.

10
Shimon Agranat, 85, Israeli jurist.
Aribert Heim, 78, Austrian SS doctor and war criminal during World War II, colorectal cancer.
Kurt A. Körber, 82, German businessman.
Adrienne J. Smith, 58, American psychologist, cancer.
S. P. P. Thorat, 85, Indian Army officer.

11
James R. Allen, 66, United States Air Force general, cancer.
Dorsey B. Hardeman, 89, American politician.
Mario Nigro, 75, Italian painter.
Bernard Ramm, 76, Canadian theologian.

12
Eduardo Anguita, 77, Chilean poet.
John Cage, 79, American composer, stroke.
Paolo Caccia Dominioni, 96, Italian soldier and resistance fighter during World War II.
Kenji Nakagami, 46, Japanese novelist and essayist, kidney cancer.
James Ellsworth Noland, 72, American judge and politician, member of the U.S. House of Representatives (1949–1951).
James W. Payne, 62, American set decorator (The Sting, Slap Shot, The Love Boat), Oscar winner (1974).
Patricia Harmsworth, Viscountess Rothermere, 63, English actress and socialite, heart attack.
Henry A. Schade, 91, American Navy officer and naval architect.

13
Clifford Allison, 27, American racing driver, racing crash.
Bets Dekens, 85, Dutch Olympic discus thrower (1928).
Jan Elburg, 72, Dutch poet.
David Kaplan, 44-45, American journalist and news producer, shot.

14
Harry Allen, 80, English executioner.
Deane Kincaide, 81, American jazz musician.
Marcel Le Glay, 72, French historian and archaeologist.
Masinde Muliro, 70, Kenyan politician.
Norah Phillips, Baroness Phillips, 82, British politician.
Senthamarai, 57, Indian actor.
John Sirica, 88, American judge, cardiac arrest.
Tony Williams, 64, American singer (The Platters), emphysema.

15
Jackie Edwards, 53-54, Jamaican musician, heart attack.
Linda Laubenstein, 45, American physician, heart attack.
Ron Malo, 56, American audio engineer.
Giorgio Perlasca, 82, Italian businessman and anti-fascist, heart attack.

16
Malcolm Atterbury, 85, American actor (The Birds, Apple's Way, Emperor of the North).
Mark Heard, 40, American musician, cardiac arrest.
Robert E. Miles, 67, American white supremacist theologist religious leader.
Yvonne Simon, 81, French racing driver.
Karl Storch, 78, German hammer thrower and Olympic medalist.
Antoni Wieczorek, 68, Polish ski jumper and Olympian, traffic collision.

17
Jéhan Le Roy, 68, French Olympic equestrian (1960).
Barbara Morgan, 92, American photographer.
John Maclay, 1st Viscount Muirshiel, 86, British politician.
Tom Nolan, 71, Irish politician.
Tommy Nutter, 49, British fashion designer, AIDS.
Al Parker, 40, American pornographic actor, producer, and director, AIDS-related complications.
Tecla San Andres Ziga, 85, Filipino politician.
Stanley Woodward, 93, American envoy and ambassador.

18
Simon Hartog, 52, British filmmaker, leukaemia.
Chris McCandless, 24, American adventurer, starvation, poisoning.
Sixten Ringbom, 57, Finnish art historian.
John Sturges, 82, American film director (The Magnificent Seven, The Great Escape, Bad Day at Black Rock), heart attack, heart failure.

19
Jean Accart, 80, French flying ace during World War II.
Clyde D. Eddleman, 90, American general.
Jean-Albert Grégoire, 93, French racing driver and engineer.
Jean Hubeau, 75, French pianist, composer and pedagogue.
Drahomír Koudelka, 46, Czech Olympic volleyball player (1968).
Norvel Lee, 67, American Olympic boxer (1952), pancreatic cancer.
George McIlraith, 84, Canadian politician.
Carsten Winger, 85, Norwegian actor.

20
Eliezer Berkovits, 83, Romanian-American theologian and rabbi.
Walter Grabmann, 86, German flying ace during World War II.
Walter Lincoln Hawkins, 81, American chemist and engineer.
Alex McKenzie, 95, New Zealand sharebroker and politician.
Liu Zhen, 77, Chinese general.

21
Theodor Berger, 87, Austrian composer.
Harry Kaskey, 90, American Olympic speed skater (1924).
Isidro Lángara, 80, Spanish football player.
Arturo Martínez, 74, Mexican film actor and director.
Zühtü Müridoğlu, 86, Turkish sculptor.
Dai Vernon, 98, Canadian magician.
Mike Wise, 28, American gridiron football player, suicide.

22
Mark E. Andrews, 88, American oil executive, complications following a stroke.
Hallowell Davis, 95, American physiologist and otolaryngologist.
Paul A. Dodd, 90, American educator and economist.
Gerald Ketchum, 83, American naval officer.
Ljubomir Kokeza, 72, Croatian football player.
Ruslan Muradov, 19, Azerbaijani soldier and war hero, killed in action.

23
David Hallifax, 64, British naval officer, ALS.
Joe Marconi, 58, American gridiron football player, leukemia.
Charles August Nichols, 81, American animator and film director.
Cyril Rushton, 69, Australian politician.
Virginia Sale, 93, American actress, heart failure.
Donald Stewart, 71, Scottish politician.
N. Veeraswamy, 60, Indian film producer.
Alf Watson, 85, Australian track and field athlete and Olympian.
Jim Young, 76, Irish hurler and Gaelic football player.

24
Bekor Ashot, 32, Armenian military leader, killed in battle.
André Donner, 74, Dutch jurist.
George Jones, 95, Australian Air Force commander.
Margie Liszt, 83, American actress, cancer.
Larrie Londin, 48, American drummer, heart attack.
Andrei Lupan, 80, Moldovan writer and politician.
Yunis Najafov, 24, Azerbaijan soldier and war hero, killed in action.
Lazăr Sfera, 83, Romanian football player.

25
Neil Stanley Crawford, 61, Canadian politician and jazz musician, ALS.
George R. Nelson, 65, American set decorator (The Godfather Part II, Apocalypse Now, The Right Stuff), Oscar winner (1975).
Frederick O'Neal, 86, American actor and television director.
Veikko Peräsalo, 80, Finnish athlete and Olympian.
Cyril Stanley Smith, 88, British metallurgist and historian of science, cancer.

26
Sammy Benskin, 69, American pianist.
Bob de Moor, 66, Belgian comic artist.
Nguyen Thi Dinh, 72, Vietnamese Army general and Vice President.
Daniel Gorenstein, 69, American mathematician.
Sammy Timberg, 89, American musician and composer.

27
Sovqiyar Abdullayev, 23, Azerbaijani soldier and war hero, killed in action.
Bengt Holbek, 59, Danish folklorist.
Gonzalo Jiménez, 90, Spanish Olympic water polo player (1928).
Peter Jørgensen, 85, Danish boxer and Olympic medalist.
George H. Kerr, 80, American diplomat.
Daniel K. Ludwig, 95, American shipping businessman.
Hélène Perdrière, 82, French stage and film actress.
Max Stiepl, 78, Austrian Olympic speed skater (1936, 1948).

28
Otar Dadunashvili, 64, Soviet and Georgian cyclist and Olympian.
Tom Drake-Brockman, 73, Australian politician.
Bedwyr Lewis Jones, 59, Welsh scholar, literary critic and linguist.
Asri Muda, 68, Malaysian politician.
Tan Qixiang, 81, Chinese geographer and historian.

29
Andy Gilbert, 78, American baseball player.
Félix Guattari, 62, French psychoanalyst and philosopher, heart attack.
Heini Hediger, 83, Swiss biologist.
Mary Norton, 88, English writer (The Borrowers).
Erling Petersen, 86, Norwegian politician.
Jo Ann Robinson, 80, American civil rights activist.
Henricus Rol, 86, Dutch painter.
Victor H. Schiro, 88, American politician.
Teddy Turner, 75, English actor (Never the Twain, Emmerdale, All Creatures Great and Small), emphysema.
Weng Weng, 34, Filipino actor, heart attack.

30
Claude Barma, 73, French director and screenwriter.
Hideo Gosha, 63, Japanese film director.
Ernst Ihbe, 78, German cyclist and Olympic champion.
Rubén Uriza, 73, Mexican show jumper and Olympic champion.

31
Matlab Guliyev, 33, Azerbaijani soldier and war herop, killed in action.
Wolfgang Güllich, 31, German rock climber, traffic collision.
Cletus F. O'Donnell, 75, American Roman Catholic prelate.
John Salathé, 93, Swiss-American rock climber.
George Leonard Trager, 86, American linguist.
Charles L. Weltner, 64, American jurist and politician.
Hans Wimmer, 85, German sculptor.

References 

1992-08
 08